Dancin' On Air was a 1980s television dance music reality television, forerunner of the TV show Dance Party USA.  Both shows were produced and created by Michael Nise and his father Frank. The show started with US$100,000 from a small group of investors that included The Tonight Show Band leader Doc Severinsen. The program earned a 128% return on investment (ROI) within the first six months. Dancin' On Air was produced at WPHL-TV Channel 17 studios in Philadelphia.

History
Dancin' On Air broadcast live from October 12, 1981 to December 31, 1987. The program reached seven East Coast states. The program was usually broadcast from WPHL-TV studios in  Philadelphia, but occasionally broadcast on-location from other locations such as Penn's Landing in Philadelphia; Ocean City, NJ; Wildwood, NJ; Six Flags Great Adventure; Dorney Park & Wildwater Kingdom; and Hersheypark.

In 1986, Dancin' On Air was syndicated by KDOC-TV in Los Angeles. The show doubled KDOC's ratings in its first week and was then picked up by the fledgling USA Network. Shortly thereafter, the show was renamed Dance Party USA, though both shows were produced for a time.

During 1986 and 1987, the Dancin' On Air studio set was that same studio used for Dance Party USA. As a result during the 1986-87 season, audiences saw the same regulars, guest dancers, and celebrities on both shows on the same days. The programs shared a weekly talk radio show,  Talkin' On Air, hosted by Michael Nise.

Hosts of the show included Eddie Bruce, Bill O'Brien, Chris Trane, Andy Gury, Annette Godfrey, Christy Springfield, Mike Rossi and Dave Raymond (the original Phillie Phanatic). Mike Rossi was a former dancer who transitioned to being a host and in 1986 became one of the youngest hosts of a live daily television program in American TV history. House dancers included Kelly Ripa and Tom Verica.

Performers on Dancin' On Air (and later Dance Party USA) included Madonna in 1983 (her first television appearance), Will Smith (as DJ Jazzy Jeff & The Fresh Prince), Duran Duran (with their first American TV appearances), Menudo (including a young Ricky Martin), Stevie Wonder, Nine Inch Nails, The Jets, New Edition, Sweet Sensation, LL Cool J, Exposé, Jody Watley, New Kids on the Block, and many other popular recording artists of the era.

The show's theme song was written by Philadelphia writer/producer Dan McKeown. Dan was also responsible for the shows entertainment division. Dancin' On Air would give selected unknown bands and artists an opportunity to perform in front of millions of dedicated viewers and was responsible for launching the careers of some of today's major super stars!

Revival
On July 23, 2011, WPHL re-aired Dancin' On Air as part of a special marathon celebrating the show's 30th anniversary. During the marathon, special vignettes were featured with former regular dancers, hosts of the show, and executive producer Michael Nise sharing their memories, experiences and thoughts from the show and also talked about how the show became a major influence and how it changed their lives.

On November 4, 2011, Mike Rossi, Princess, Jimmy Jam (James Ferguson), Andy Gury and Eddie Bruce hosted a 30th reunion dance party celebration.

On March 6, 2012, WPHL announced that Dancin' On Air would return to the air on March 31, where it would air Saturday mornings at 10 a.m. WRDW-FM has been tapped as the official radio station for the program. Core group members include Brittainy Taylor, DeAnna Marie, Jeanna Zettler, Mikey P, Paulie Scalia, Anthony Vee, Anthony Franzzo (AKA DJ ZO), Nicole Peraino, Nicole Zell, Ian Ashanti, John Haslett, Kobi Kearney, Casey on Wired, and DJ Josiah.

A full-length documentary on the show's history was produced and featured interviews with several regulars and crew members along with producer Michael Nise. As of 2014, it has yet to be released.

Controversy
On April 10, 2016, Philadelphia magazine published an article detailing a new feud between many of the people who were on Dancin' On Air in their teens and the producer of the show.

References

External links
Official Website

1980s American music television series
2010s American music television series
2020s American music television series
1981 American television series debuts
1987 American television series endings
2012 American television series debuts
Dance television shows
American television series revived after cancellation
English-language television shows
Television in Philadelphia